Charles Francis Smithers (November 25, 1822 – May 20, 1887) was a Canadian banker.

Born in London, England, Smithers emigrated to Montreal, Canada East in 1847. He joined the Bank of Montreal in 1858 as an inspector. In 1862, he became a joint agent of the New York branch. He joined the London and Colonial Bank in 1863 before rejoining the Bank in 1869. In 1879, he became a general manager of the Bank and was appointed President in 1881. He served in this position until his death in 1887.

References

1822 births
1887 deaths
Bank of Montreal presidents
Anglophone Quebec people
English emigrants to pre-Confederation Quebec